Leadon is a surname. Notable people with the surname include:

 Bernie Leadon (born 1947), American musician
 Steven A. Leadon, professor
 Tom Leadon, American musician

See also
 River Leadon, river in Herefordshire and Gloucestershire, England, a tributary of the River Severn